Henry Walker Bishop (June 2, 1829 – September 28, 1913) was a Massachusetts-born leading citizen of Chicago, Illinois in the late 19th century. He was the first president of the Union Club of Chicago, a private association organized by sixty of the city's leading gentlemen. His tenure lasted from 1878 to 1883. He later was president of the Chicago Club from 1892 through 1894.

A judicial official, he also served as a master in chancery.

Biography 
Henry W. Bishop was born in Lenox, Massachusetts on June 2, 1829. He attended Lenox Academy, and was briefly a student at Williams College, before graduating from Amherst in 1850.

After attending Harvard Law School and studying law with his father, he began practicing as a lawyer in Chicago in 1856.

He died in Sea Bright, New Jersey on September 28, 1913.

In his will, Bishop left $2.5 million to the John Crerar Library of engineering, medical, and science texts, located on the University of Chicago campus.

References 

University of Chicago people
People from Chicago
People from Berkshire County, Massachusetts
1829 births
1913 deaths
Amherst College alumni
Massachusetts lawyers